The Grindelwald Fluctuation (also known as Little Ice Age) was a period of cooling that occurred from the 13th to the mid 19th century (1560 to 1630); characterised by the expansion of glaciers in many parts of the world, including the Alps in Europe. It produced some of the lowest temperatures known to this holocene.

The Grindelwald Fluctuation is a term used to refer to a specific period in this wider cooling phenomenon when the glaciers in Grindelwald, Switzerland expanded significantly. Temperatures were 1-2 degrees Celsius lower than twentieth-century averages during this period, which is thought to have lasted from the 1560s to the 1630s.

Causes
The expansion of the Swiss Grindelwald glaciers during this period was likely due to a combination of factors, including volcanic activity, changes in solar radiation, and the sudden decrease in population numbers.

Volcanic Events
The Grindelwald Fluctuation is believed to have been partially caused by a slew of volcanic eruptions.

A succession of volcanic eruptions can create a cooling effect. When a volcano erupts it releases sulphur dioxide and other aerosols into the stratosphere, which can block some of the sun’s radiation from reaching the Earth’s surface. Depending on the size and frequency of these eruptions, the cooling effects can last anywhere from a few years to a few decades.

In 1585, the Colima volcano in Mexico erupted. 10 years later in 1595, Nevado del Ruiz erupted. Then in 1600, five years later, the Huaynaputina volcano erupted in what is known as one of the most powerful explosions to occur in the last 2500 years. These back to back major volcanic explosions can cause long-term cooling by activating “positive feedback” in different parts of the Earth’s climate system. 

However it is believed that the Grindelwald Fluctuation began some 15 years prior to the first volcanic eruption.

Solar Activity
Solar radiation is a major driver of the Earth’s climate. Changes in solar radiation can affect the temperature and precipitation patterns on Earth. During the Little Ice Age, the amount of solar radiation reaching the Earth’s surface was lower than it is today due to an event known as the Maunder Minimum; the most recent Grand Solar Minimum. This minimum lasted from 1645 to 1715 coinciding with the Grindelwald Fluctuation, therefore it is thought to have contributed to the expansion of glaciers, however it is not clear to what extent the changes in solar radiation affected the expansion of the Grindelwald glaciers. It is however possible that these changes in solar radiation were a contributing factor to the Grindelwald Fluctuation.

This shift in solar activity can be proved by: 
Historical records: historical records, such as ship logs and weather observations indicate that the Earth’s climate was cooler during the overarching Little Ice Age than it is today. 
Ice cores: scientists have studied the chemical composition of ice cores (long tubes of ice that are drilled from glaciers and ice sheets) to learn of past climate conditions. 
Tree rings: the width of tree rings can be used to reconstruct past climate conditions, as trees grow more slowly in cooler temperatures. Tree ring data from the Little Ice Age seems to prove a reduction in solar activity.  

Overall, the evidence suggests that the amount of solar radiation reaching the Earth's surface was slightly lower during the Grindelwald Fluctuation, and this reduction in solar radiation is thought to have contributed to the expansion of the glaciers.

Decreased Population
Human activities such as deforestation and land use changes are known to negatively affect local climate patterns. William Ruddiman, a palaeoclimatologist, proposed the hypothesis that human activity has been affecting the Earth’s climate for much longer than previously thought. In particular, Ruddiman has argued that the early adoption of agriculture and land-use practices by human societies, beginning around 8,000 years ago, led to the release of significant amounts of greenhouse gases into the atmosphere, which may have contributed to the warming of the Earth's climate.

It is difficult to accurately assess the extent of depopulation that occurred during both the 1500s and 1600s, as reliable population data from this period is limited. However it is known that this period was one of significant upheaval and change, with many regions experiencing significant population drops due to wars, plagues, famines, and natural disasters. The bubonic plague, for instance, killed between 75 to 200 million people in Europe alone. It is also believed that an onset of disease during the Little Ice Age may have led to further depopulation.

This decline in population meant that cultivated lands became unkempt, allowing for the regrowth of wild plants. This is perceived to be the cause for the drop in atmospheric carbon dioxide in the sixteenth century thus exacerbating the extreme cooling period. However, of the causes, depopulation is the least significant.

Historical Records
In historical records, the Grindelwald Fluctuation is characterised by a further drop in temperatures and more frequent cold spells throughout many parts of the world. The more notable records; written by a Jacobean weather enthusiast in Bristol, chronicle some of the effects the weather Fluctuation had on agriculture and society. They specifically discuss food shortages and crop failures taking precedence throughout the area.

References 

History of climate variability and change
Glaciology
Ice ages